Brazil–North Korea relations are the current and historical bilateral relations between Brazil and North Korea. Brazil has an embassy in Pyongyang.

According to a 2013 BBC World Service Poll, 22% of Brazilians view North Korea's influence positively, with 47% expressing a negative view.

History

Despite the Brazilian government's economic relations with North Korea, it has generally condemned controversial North Korean actions that threaten stability in East Asia, such as the 2009 North Korean nuclear test, upon which the Brazilian Ministry for Foreign Affairs stated that the Brazilian Government vehemently condemns North Korea's nuclear test and urged the country to sign the Comprehensive Test Ban Treaty and return to the six-party talks as soon as possible, and the ROKS Cheonan sinking, upon which the Brazilian Ministry of External Relations issued a statement saying the government expresses solidarity with South Korea and urged stability on the Korean peninsula. North Korea took part in the Rio 2016 Olympics, suggesting better stability between the two countries.

See also
 Foreign relations of Brazil 
 Foreign relations of North Korea 
 Brazil–South Korea relations

References

North Korea
Bilateral relations of North Korea